, is a Japanese actress, model and beauty pageant titleholder who was crowned Miss Universe Japan 2017 and represented Japan at Miss Universe 2017.

Life and career
Momoko was born in Chiba Prefecture in Japan. Her mother is a professional golf player. Her father is the television reporter Yuji Abe. Since childhood she learned how to play golf, piano, swimming and ballet. She speaks English and Japanese fluently, and studied Philosophy at the University of the Sacred Heart (Japan) in Tokyo.

Miss Universe Japan 2017
On 4 July 2017, Abe was crowned Miss Universe Japan 2017. Abe was crowned the winner by outgoing titleholder Sari Nakazawa.

Miss Universe 2017
Abe represented Japan at Miss Universe 2017 and won the Best national costume award.

References

1994 births
Living people
Miss Universe 2017 contestants
Japanese beauty pageant winners
Japanese female models
People from Urayasu, Chiba